Piscophoca is an extinct genus of pinniped. The genus was named after the fossiliferous Pisco Formation in Peru, where the holotype was found. Other fossils of the genus were found in the Bahía Inglesa Formation of the Caldera Basin in Chile.

References 

Lobodontins
Prehistoric carnivoran genera
Miocene pinnipeds
Pinnipeds of South America
Miocene mammals of South America
Neogene Peru
Fossils of Peru
 
Fossil taxa described in 1981